Tanna is a genus of cicadas from Southeast Asia and East Asia. In 2010 Lee and Hill placed Tanna in the subtribe Leptopsaltriina, which is now in the tribe Leptopsaltriini together with a number of related genera that also possess abdominal tubercles, including Leptopsaltria, Maua, Nabalua, Purana, and others.

Species
The Global Biodiversity Information Facility lists:
 Tanna abdominalis (Kato, 1938)
 Tanna aquilonia Lee & Lei, 2014
 Tanna auripennis Kato, 1930
 Tanna bakeri Moulton, 1923
 Tanna bhutanensis Distant, 1912
 Tanna conyla (Chou & Lei, 1997)
 Tanna crassa Lee & Emery, 2020 - Vietnam
 Tanna harpesi Lallemand & Synave, 1953
 Tanna infuscata Lee & Hayashi, 2004
 Tanna insignis Distant, 1906
 Tanna ishigakiana Kato, 1960
 Tanna japonensis (Distant, 1892)- type species (as Pomponia japonensis Distant, 1892)
 Tanna karenkonis Kato, 1939
 Tanna kimtaewooi Lee, 2010
 Tanna obliqua Liu, 1940
 Tanna ornata Kato, 1940
 Tanna ornatipennis Esaki, 1933
 Tanna pallida Distant, 1906
 Tanna puranoides Boulard, 2008
 Tanna sayurie Kato, 1926
 Tanna shensiensis (Sanborn, 2006)
 Tanna sinensis (Ôuchi, 1938)
 Tanna sozanensis Kato, 1926
 Tanna taipinensis (Matsumura, 1907)
 Tanna tairikuana Kato, 1940
 Tanna viridis Kato, 1925

References

 
Insects of Asia
Taxa named by William Lucas Distant
Leptopsaltriini
Cicadidae genera